Iroijlaplap (feminine: Leroijlaplap) are the traditional paramount chiefs in the Marshall Islands. Ordinary chiefs bear the title of Iroij (feminine: Leroij); - is a superlative suffix.

Legal basis 
Article III of the Constitution of the Marshall Islands recognises the title, and establishes a Council of Iroij, composed of holders of the title of Iroijlaplap, or other analogous traditional titles, chosen from holders of the chieftainship among the several constituent islands.

The council is empowered to "consider any matter of concern to the Republic of the Marshall Islands, and it may express its opinion thereon to the Cabinet". The council is also entitled to formally request the reconsideration of any bill in the Nitijela (the country's Legislature), that affects customary law, traditional practices, or land tenure.

Reigning Iroijlaplap 
There are currently two Iroijlaplap:

Michael Kabua of Kwajalein
Remios Hermios of the Ratak Chain (excluding Majuro, Arno and Mili atolls).

References

Marshallese culture
Titles of national or ethnic leadership
Main